María Isabel Llaudes Santiago (born 4 December 1945), better known by her stage name Karina, is a Spanish singer who had her biggest success in the late 1960s until the mid-1970s. She was born in Jaén, Andalusia to Trinidad Santiago and Salvador Llaudes.

Career

After working in television for some years, she recorded her first album in 1964, which was especially successful in Venezuela. She became known to the Spanish audience in 1965 with a hit version of France Gall's "Poupée de cire, poupée de son". She also recorded a contemporary Spanish [or Portuguese?] version of the James Bond song Goldfinger. In 1966, she was awarded the Best Yé-yé Singer Prize. One of her films she starred in was "Los Chicos del Preu" (The College Kids) (1967). Her songs, like "Romeo y Julieta", "Las flechas del amor", "El baúl de los recuerdos", and "La fiesta" became hits in Spain.

She represented Spain at the 1971 Eurovision Song Contest with the song "En un mundo nuevo", where she placed second, bested only by Monaco's contestant Séverine with her song "Un banc, un arbre, une rue". After Eurovision she starred in the same-titled film En un mundo nuevo, which was inspired by her participation at the contest. At the end of the yé-yé years she moved to Mexico where she became moderately successful singing rancheras. She is still performing today.

Personal life
She has been married four times and has two daughters. In recent years, she was diagnosed with cancer but has since made a full recovery in the USA.

Discography

Selected LP
1966 "Karina Vol. I"
1968 "Karina Vol. II"
1970 "Karina Vol. III"
1970 "Colores"
1971 "Pasaporte a Dublín"
1972 "Tiempo al tiempo"
1972 "Lo mejor de Karina"
1973 "Lo mejor de Karina"
1974 "Lady Elizabeth"
1974 "Juntos para ayudarte"
1978 "Karina"
1985 "El disco de oro de Karina"
1991 "Soy como soy"
1995 "Primera época (1961–1964)"

See also
 List of yé-yé singers

References

External links

1945 births
Living people
People from Jaén, Spain
Spanish women singers
Eurovision Song Contest entrants for Spain
Eurovision Song Contest entrants of 1971
Singers from Andalusia